The 1995 La Flèche Wallonne was the 59th edition of La Flèche Wallonne cycle race and was held on 12 April 1995. The race started in Spa and finished in Huy. The race was won by Laurent Jalabert of the ONCE team.

General classification

References

1995 in road cycling
1995
1995 in Belgian sport